The Skjold (or Skiold) was a Danish three-mast Barque, built in Sønderborg 1839, and displacing 460 tons. It was owned by C. Petersen, Sønderborg.

Captains
Hans Christian Claussen

Voyages
Altona to Port Adelaide, South Australia - 3 July 1841 to 28 October 1841 with Prussian immigrants including Pastor Gotthard Fritzsche
Port Adelaide, South Australia to Batavia - departed 22 November 1841
Hamburg to Nelson, New Zealand - 21 April 1844 to 1 September 1844 with German immigrants.

References
 "Ships arriving in South Australia 1841", Pioneers Association of South Australia
 "Shipping Arrivals", South Australian Genealogy & Heraldry Society Inc
 "Graeme Moad Skjold passenger list 1841
 "State Library of South Australia - Skjold passenger list 1841"
 "'SKJOLD' Passenger List"

Barques